Northwestern Medicine Woodstock Hospital (formerly Centegra Hospital - Woodstock) is a hospital in Woodstock, Illinois. The hospital is a division of Northwestern Medicine since 2018 when Northwestern Medicine partnered with Centegra Health System.

History
In 1914, a group of physicians obtained a charter for a hospital in the home and office of Hyde West. The success of this hospital was such that a second hospital was built on South Street in the city. This hospital was named Woodstock Memorial Hospital. The hospital was named Centegra Hospital - Woodstock until 2018 when it was renamed Northwestern Medicine Woodstock Hospital after Northwestern Medicine's takeover.

References

External links
 

1914 establishments in Illinois
Buildings and structures in McHenry County, Illinois
Hospitals established in 1914
Hospitals in Illinois
Woodstock, Illinois
Northwestern Medicine